Gabriela Aguirre  (born 19 February 1986) is an Argentine field hockey midfielder and part of the Argentina national team. 
She was part of the Argentine team at the 2016 Summer Olympics in Rio de Janeiro. On club level she plays for Banco Provincia in Argentina.

References

External links

External links
 
 
http://www.eltribuno.info/gabriela-aguirre-el-hockey-mi-prioridad-n442300
http://www.alentandooo.com.ar/gabriela-aguirre-las-leonas-era-una-etapa-que-ya-habia-cerrado-mi-vida-n726072
http://www.alentandooo.com.ar/gabriela-aguirre-volvera-ser-parte-las-leonas-n655388
http://www.hockeymobile.com.ar/nota/Gabriela-Aguirre-y-su-nueva-oportunidad-en-Las-Leonas?id=2660
http://www.zimbio.com/pictures/RzGCoo5Nt77/Hockey+Olympics+Day+8/v6jE9tX6yqX/Gabriela+Aguirre

1986 births
Living people
Argentine female field hockey players
Olympic field hockey players of Argentina
Field hockey players at the 2016 Summer Olympics
South American Games gold medalists for Argentina
South American Games medalists in field hockey
Competitors at the 2006 South American Games
Pan American Games gold medalists for Argentina
Pan American Games medalists in field hockey
Field hockey players at the 2007 Pan American Games
Medalists at the 2007 Pan American Games
People from Salta
Sportspeople from Salta Province
20th-century Argentine women
21st-century Argentine women